Zsófia Erdélyi (born 10 December 1987 in Budapest) is a Hungarian long-distance runner.

Erdélyi ran 2:39:04 and placed 52nd at Athletics at the 2016 Summer Olympics – Women's marathon.

Hungary at the 2016 European Athletics Championships 2016 European Athletics Championships – Women's half marathon in 1:21:32.

1:15:25 in 2015 Vienna City Half-Marathon.

Erdélyi finished 21st in the 2014 European Athletics Championships – Women's 10,000 metres. 

Hungary at the 2014 Summer Youth Olympics Athletics at the 2014 Summer Youth Olympics Athletics at the 2014 Summer Youth Olympics – Girls' 2000 metre steeplechase

She competed in the marathon at the 2012 Summer Olympics, placing 92nd with a time of 2:44:45.

Zsofia ran 2:48:58 to win 2011 Rock 'n' Roll Las Vegas Marathon.

Hungary at the 2010 European Athletics Championships

2009 European Athletics U23 Championships – Women's 10,000 metres

2007 European Athletics U23 Championships – Women's 5000 metres
2007 European Athletics U23 Championships – Women's 10,000 metres

Zsofia ran 10:41.71 to place 12th at 2006 World Junior Championships in Athletics – Women's 3000 metres steeplechase.

Zsófia is the ninth USC cross country runner to qualify for the NCAA Championships.

References

External links
 
 
 
 
 

1987 births
Living people
Hungarian female long-distance runners
Hungarian female steeplechase runners
Olympic athletes of Hungary
Athletes (track and field) at the 2012 Summer Olympics
Athletes (track and field) at the 2016 Summer Olympics
Athletes from Budapest
20th-century Hungarian women
21st-century Hungarian women